Mohammad Mokri (1921 – July 12, 2007) (محمد مکری) was an Iranian scholar (Kurdologist) and author born in Kermanshah. He wrote over 100 books and 700 articles during his lifetime. He worked very closely with the Prime Minister of Iran Mohammad Mossadegh until his removal from power on August 19, 1953 during Operation Ajax.

Mokri moved to Paris, France in 1953, where he lived until 1979 when he and Ayatollah Ruhollah Khomeini returned to Iran. He lived in Iran and worked as the personal aide to the Ayatollah.  He served as Iran's first ambassador to the former Soviet Union after the revolution and later as ambassador to Mongolia. Following disagreements with Khomeini, he moved back to France. He died at his home in Evry, France on July 12, 2007.

Works and publications
 La Légende De Bizan-u Manija, Version Populaire Du Sud Du Kurdistan En Langue Gouranie (ÉPisode Du Shahnama, éPopée Iranienne). Texte éTabli, Introduction, Traduction, Thèmes Folkloriques, Notes Linguistiques Et Glossaire, 1966
 Le Chasseur de Dieu et le mythe du Roi-Aigle (Dawra-y Damyari). Beiträge zur Iranistik, 1967
 Recherches de kurdologie, contribution scientifique aux études iraniennes, 1970 
 Odes Mystiques (Divan-E Shams-E Tabrizi) (contributing author), 1973 
 Persico-kurdica Études D'ethnologie, De Dialectologie, D'histoire et De Religion Parues Dans Les Années 1964-1978 Contributions Scientifiques Aux Études Iraniennes Mythes et Mots
 Le thème de la lumière dans le judaïsme, le christianisme et l'Islam, 1976 (Contributing author)
 Étude d'Hérésiologie Islamique et de Thèmes Mythico-Religieux Iraniens: La Grande Assemblée des Fidèles de Vérité au Tribunal sur le Mont Zagros en Iran (Dawra-Y Diwana-Gawra) Livre secret et inédit en gourani ancien Texte critique, traduction, introduction et commentaires avec des notes linguistiques et glossaire., 1977 (Author and Translator)
 La Grande Assemblée des Fidèles de Vérité au Tribunal sur le Mont Zagros en Iran ( Dawra-Y Diwana-Gawra ). Livre Secret et Inédit en Gourani Ancien., 1977
 La lumiere et le feu dans l'Iran ancien (origine, structure, developpement et systematisation) et leur demythification en Islam: Spiritualite . et ethnographiques) (French Edition), 1982 
 Cycle des fidèles compagnon à l'époque de buhlûl
 Etudes métriques et éthnolinguistiques. Analyse historique et premier essai de systématisation de la poésie syllabique dialectale et populaire iranienne (persane et kurde) + Les chants éternels kurdes (chants d'amour et de douleur). Parts I-III, 1994
 Le Chasseur de Dieu et le mythe du Roi-Aigle (Dawra-y Damyari). Texte etabli, traduit et commente avec une etude sur la chasse mystique, le temps cycliques et des notes linguistiques. (= Beiträge zur Iranistik) [zweisprachige Ausgabe]
 Son nom était Iran (FLEUVE ET ECHO) (French Edition), 2003 
 His name was Iran. Translation from Persian, preface and notes by Anne Lecerf, 2003
 Les Frontieres Du Nord de l'Iran (Varia) (French Edition), 2004 
 L'Esotérisme kurde. Aperçus sur le secret gnostique des Fidèles de Vérité., (contributing author) 2005

Resources

External links 
 Professor Mohammad Mokri's official website (in French): http://siegfried.mokri.free.fr/index_html.html
 The Indian Express

1921 births
2007 deaths
Iranian Kurdish people
Exiles of the Iranian Revolution in France
Iranian scholars
Iranian writers
Ambassadors of Iran to the Soviet Union
Ambassadors of Iran to Mongolia
Iranian Yarsanis
Iranian expatriates in France
National Front (Iran) politicians
Candidates in the 1980 Iranian presidential election